Yoakum Independent School District is a public school district based in Yoakum, Texas (USA).

In 2011, the school district was rated "Academically Acceptable" by the Texas Education Agency.

Schools
Yoakum High School (grades 9-12)
Yoakum Primary School (grades K-2)
Yoakum Intermediate School (grades 3-5)
Yoakum Junior High school (grades 6-8)

The Bulldog Band
The band is a school group that consists of many talented students who play off at contests, concerts, and football games. In the past years, the marching band as made it to the state marching competition.

References

External links
 

School districts in DeWitt County, Texas
School districts in Lavaca County, Texas
School districts in Gonzales County, Texas